is a Japanese footballer who plays as a central defender for JEF United Chiba.  He represented his country at the 2012 Summer Olympics.

Club career
Suzuki joined Albirex Niigata as an apprentice professional in 2007. He turned full-time professional with Albirex at the start of the 2008 season and made his first team debut against Nara Club in the second round of the Emperor's Cup. His first J. League appearance was in the 2–1 away win over Vissel Kobe on 1 May 2010.

He made 24 appearances during the 2010 season, scoring his first goal against Urawa Red Diamonds at Saitama Stadium on 28 May 2011.

In January 2016, he announced the departure from Kashiwa Reysol after three seasons to look for new opportunities for his career. On 16 February, he signed for Spanish Segunda División club Gimnàstic de Tarragona.

National team career
In 2007, Suzuki received a call-up to the Japan U-17 national team squad for the 2007 U-17 World Cup. He played 2 matches. He was then also selected as part of the Japan U-23 national team for the 2010 Asian Games and 2012 Summer Olympics. He played all 6 matches as center back with Maya Yoshida and Japan won the 4th place.

In July 2013, Suzuki was elected Japan national team for 2013 East Asian Cup. At this tournament, on 25 July, he debuted against Australia. He played 2 games for Japan until 2014.

Club statistics
Updated to 5 June 2022.

1Includes Japanese Super Cup.

National team statistics

Honours

Club
Kashiwa Reysol
 J. League Cup：2013
 Suruga Bank Championship：2014

International
Japan U21
 Asian Games: 2010

Japan
 EAFF East Asian Cup：2013

Individual
 AFC Champions League Dream team：2013

References

External links

 
 Japan National Football Team Database
 
 
 
 

1990 births
Living people
Association football central defenders
Association football people from Ishikawa Prefecture
Japanese footballers
Japan youth international footballers
Japan international footballers
J1 League players
Albirex Niigata players
Kashiwa Reysol players
Segunda División players
Gimnàstic de Tarragona footballers
Urawa Red Diamonds players
JEF United Chiba players
Olympic footballers of Japan
Footballers at the 2012 Summer Olympics
Asian Games medalists in football
Footballers at the 2010 Asian Games
Japanese expatriate footballers
Japanese expatriate sportspeople in Spain
Expatriate footballers in Spain
Asian Games gold medalists for Japan
Medalists at the 2010 Asian Games